Goodall may refer to:

 Alan Goodall (born 1981), English football full back
 Archie Goodall (1864–1929), Irish footballer
 Caroline Goodall (born 1959), English actress
 Charles Miner Goodall (1824–1899), American entrepreneur
 Charlotte Goodall (1766–1830), British actress
 David Goodall (botanist) (1914–2018), Australian botanist and ecologist
 David Goodall (diplomat) (1931–2016), British diplomat
 David Goodall (director) (born 1964), Scottish film director, producer and actor
 David Goodall (chemist), British chemist
 Edward Goodall (1795–1870), English engraver
 Edward Angelo Goodall (1819–1908), English artist, son of Edward Goodall (1795–1870)
 Frederick Goodall (1822–1904), English artist, son of Edward Goodall (1795–1870)
 Gladys Goodall (1908–2015), New Zealand photographer 
 Herb Goodall (1870–1938), American professional baseball player
 Howard Goodall (born 1958), British composer
 Hurley Goodall (1927–2021), American politician
 Jane Goodall (born 1934), British ethologist and primatologist
 Jane R. Goodall (born 1951), Australian novelist
 John Goodall (1863–1942), British footballer
 Jonathan Goodall (born 1961), former English Anglican bishop
 Joshua Goodall (born 1985), British tennis player
 Ken Goodall (1947–2006), Irish rugby union footballer
 Lara Goodall (born 1996), South African cricketer
 Lewis Goodall (born 1989), Newsnight correspondent & Sky News reporter
 Louis B. Goodall (1851–1935), American politician
 Medwyn Goodall (born 1961), British composer and musician
 Oliver Goodall (1922–2010), one of the Tuskegee Airmen
 Peter Goodall (born 1949), Australian academic and author
 Reginald Goodall (1901–1990), English conductor
 Sir Roderick Goodall (1947–1921), British air marshal
 Roy Goodall (1902–1982), British professional footballer
 Samuel Goodall (died 1801), British naval officer
 Sir Stanley Vernon Goodall, British naval architect
 Steve Goodall (born 1957), Australian racing cyclist
 Walter Goodall (circa 1706–1766), Scottish historical writer

Other uses
 16857 Goodall, a minor planet
 Goodall Building, a historic commercial building in Cincinnati, Ohio, U.S.
 Goodall Cup, awarded to the playoff champions of the Australian Ice Hockey League
 Goodall focus, a Hopewellian people from Indiana and Michigan, U.S.
 Goodall Park, a baseball venue in Sanford, Maine, U.S.
 Goodall Ridge, Prince Charles Mountains, Antarctica
 , a British frigate commissioned into the Royal Navy in 1943 and sunk in 1945
 Mount Goodall, a mountain in British Columbia, Canada

See also
 Goodale (disambiguation)
 Goodell (disambiguation)
 Goodall House (disambiguation)
 

English-language surnames